The Hongqi HQE (红旗HQE) is a large four-door limousine built by FAW Hongqi. Released in 2009, it is the first Chinese-built V12 cylinder engine-equipped luxury car. As Hongqi's most advanced top-of-the-line vehicle type, the HQE will serve as the high-end vehicle for VIPs and high-ranking national officials. The HQE was designated the presidential vehicle for paramount leader Hu Jintao's troop review for the People's Republic of China National Day 60th anniversary celebration. The production model of the HQE is called L7 (short wheel base) and L9 when the mass production began in 2013.

Design 
Based on the HQD concept car, the HQE is completely hand-built. The body comprises a rectangular section of galvanized steel with square edged exterior panels mounted on a Toyota Land Cruiser Prado-derived chassis, and the outward appearance and detailing contains aspects of Chinese styling. Dimensionally it is 6.4 meters long, 2.05 meters wide, and 1.72 meters high. The HQE is priced at over 3,000,000 RMB or approximately US$439,300 (as of 2009). An armoured version of the car is also available. The Hongqi was designed at the FAW R&D facility in Changchun. The design team was staffed jointly by FAW and Magna Steyr, and contained members from China, Austria, the United Kingdom and the United States.

Performance 
The HQE is powered by an independently researched and developed aluminium V12 cylinder engine of Chinese design (designation CA12VG), with a displacement of 6.0 liters and producing 300 kW (400 hp) at 5600 rpm and 550 Nm (405 lb·ft) of torque at 4400 rpm.

External links
http://autonews.gasgoo.com/auto-news/1009269/FAW-to-launch-all-new-Hongqi-limo-HQE-in-09.html
http://www.chinacartimes.com/2009/06/22/chairman-hu-to-ride-in-hong-qing-hqe-v12-on-oct-1st/
http://autonews.gasgoo.com/auto-news/1012408/President-s-car-unveiled-at-National-Day-military-parade.html

HQE
Luxury vehicles
Flagship vehicles
Full-size vehicles
Rear-wheel-drive vehicles
Retro-style automobiles
Limousines